Narco or Narcos may refer to:

People
Narc, slang for a U.S. Drug Enforcement Administration agent
Narcoculture, people involved in organized crime or illegal drug trade relating to narcotics

Places
Narco (Thrace), a settlement in ancient Thrace, now in Turkey

Arts, entertainment, and media
Narco (film), 2004 French film
"Narco" (Blasterjaxx and Timmy Trumpet song), 2017
El Narco: Inside Mexico's Criminal Insurgency (2011), a non-fiction book about the Mexican Drug War
Narcos (2015), a Netflix Original drama series
"Narcos" (Migos song), 2018
"Narcos" (Anuel AA song), 2020
Narco pelicula, sub-genre of Mexican action film

Medical
Hydrocodone/paracetamol, sold in some countries under the brand name Narco
Narcolepsy, human sleep disorder